Eelde is a town in the Dutch province of Drenthe. It is a part of the municipality of Tynaarlo, and lies about 9 km south of Groningen. Groningen Airport Eelde is located near the village.

Eelde was a separate municipality until 1998, when it was merged with Vries and Zuidlaren.

During the 20th century, the villages of Eelde and Paterswolde have merged into one, "Eelde-Paterswolde". In 2012, Eelde counted 6,660 inhabitants, and Paterswolde 3,680, together 10,340 inhabitants.

Its major attractions are Groningen Airport Eelde, museum "De Buitenplaats", the annual flower parade and the lake "Paterswoldse meer".

Climate

References

External links 

Eelde, een lied van George Welling on YouTube

Municipalities of the Netherlands disestablished in 1998
Populated places in Drenthe
Former municipalities of Drenthe
Tynaarlo